Pieter Jacobsz Olycan (1572 – 1658), was a Dutch brewer, magistrate, and later mayor of Haarlem, best known today for his portraits by Frans Hals, as well as for the portraits of his wife Maritge Claesdr. Voogt.

Biography

He was a merchant in oils and grains in Amsterdam with a warehouse called "In den Olycan", which became his name. He was also a brewer in Haarlem on the Spaarne river with a large brewery called the "Vogelstruys". Pieter Olycan was one of three brewers from Haarlem who sold his “Vogelstruys” beer from a 'bierstekerij' on the Bierkade in Purmerend.
He married Maritje Claesdr Voogt and through her he became the brother-in-law to two more brewers of Haarlem. They became the parents of:
 Jacob, who later followed in his father's footsteps 
 Dorothea, who married Cornelis van Loo of brewery De Drie Leliën
 IJsbrant, who studied law
 Volckje, who married Johan Schatter
 Nicolaes, who married Agatha Dicx of brewery Het Scheepje
 Maria, who married the brewer Andries van Hoorn
 Hester, who married Tyman Oosdorp

Pieter Olycan was a member of the Haarlem regency and became a magistrate and mayor of Haarlem, and served in the Haarlem Cluveniers Civic guard. He was portrayed by Hendrik Gerritsz Pot in his group portrait of the St Adrian Civic Guard in 1630.

References

1572 births
1658 deaths
Frans Hals
Businesspeople from Haarlem
Mayors of Haarlem
Dutch businesspeople
Dutch brewers